Albert Monnier, (22 July 1815 – 1 July 1869) was a 19th-century French author, poet, biographer and playwright.

Works (selection) 
 Le Dada de Paimboeuf, with Édouard Martin
  Mauricette, vaudeville in one act
  Le bûcher de Sardanapale, vaudeville in one act
 Un Oncle aux carottes, with  Édouard Martin
 Coqsigrue poli par amour, vaudeville in one act
 Ce que vivent les roses, comédie-vaudeville in one act
 Turlututu chapeau pointu, féerie with Édouard Martin and Clairville
 
Biographies :
 Biographie de Charles Deburau fils
 Biographie de Laferrière
 Biographie de Deburau with Charles Deburau

References 

 

19th-century French dramatists and playwrights
French biographers
Writers from Paris
1815 births
1869 deaths